4th English Album is a studio album of the French singer Françoise Hardy released in South Africa in 1971.
A French edition was released with no title in 1972. Since its French reissue in 2000 on CD, the album has a new cover and bears the title of its most commercially successful song: If You Listen (See section: "Other editions").

First edition 
 , December 1971: LP, 4th English Album, MvN (MVC 3520).

Background 
Arrangements, directions artistic: Tony Cox (A1 to A5 + B1 to B4), Hervé Roy (A6), Tommy Brown and Micky Jones (B5)
 Sound engineers: Victor (A1 to A5 + B1 to B4 + B6), Bernard Estardy (A6), René Ameline (B5)

Track listing

Others editions 
 , 1972: LP, Let My Name Be Sorrow, éd. Kundalini/Interfusion (SITFL 934.290).
 , 1972: LP, Let My Name Be Sorrow, éd. Kundalini/Interfusion (SITFL 934.290).
 , September 1972: LP, Kundalini Editions (KUN 65057).
 , 1972: LP, Kundalini/CBS (S 65057). 
 , 1974: LP, Kundalini/Som Livre (404.7039). 
 , 1975: LP, Love Songs, Kundalini/Epic (ECPO 18).

Reissues 
 , 1979 : LP, Love Songs, éd. Kundalini/Epic/Sony (25-3P-75).
 , 1990: CD, Love Songs, éd. Kundalini/Epic/Sony (ESCA 5190).
 , September 2000: CD (digipak), If You Listen, Virgin (7 24384 99452 5).
 , April 2013: CD, Midnight Blues – Paris . London . 1968-72, Ace International (CDCHD 1358).
 , June 2017: CD (digipak), If You Listen, Parlophone/Warner Music.
 , June 2017: LP (black 180 g), If You Listen, Parlophone/Warner Music.

References 

Françoise Hardy albums
1971 albums